Proscissio is a genus of parasitic flies in the family Tachinidae of the Diptera order of Insects. There are about five described species in Proscissio.

Species
These five species belong to the genus Proscissio:
 Proscissio albiceps Malloch, 1938
 Proscissio cana Hutton, 1901
 Proscissio lateralis Malloch, 1938
 Proscissio milleri Malloch, 1938
 Proscissio montana Hutton, 1901

References

Further reading

 
 
 
 

Tachinidae
Articles created by Qbugbot